Heinrich Hermanns (19 May 1862 – 21 December 1942, Düsseldorf) was a German lithographer and landscape painter. He was also known for architectural paintings and vedute and was associated with the Düsseldorfer Malerschule.

Biography 
Boen in Düsseldorf, Hermanns completed his primary education in 1883 and went on to study at the Kunstakademie Düsseldorf with Eugen Dücker, Heinrich Lauenstein, Georg Heinrich Crola and Johann Peter Theodor Janssen. He graduated from the Kunstakademie in 1893.

He had a special fondness for the landscapes of Holland, West and Northwest Germany. After 1887, he was a frequent visitor to Hümmling. He also took long study trips to France, Spain and Italy, especially Lake Garda, Naples and Sicily. Later, he turned to architectural scenes and interiors; often rendered in watercolors.

Until the 1930s, he held showings at most major German art exhibitions, including the (Glaspalast in Munich, the Große Berliner Kunstausstellung and the ).

References

Further reading 
 Hans Paffrath (Ed.): Lexikon der Düsseldorfer Malerschule 1819–1918. Vol. 2: Haach–Murtfeldt, Kunstmuseum Düsseldorf im Ehrenhof and the Galerie Paffrath. Bruckmann, 1998, .
 Hans Vollmer (Ed.): Künstlerlexikon. Vol. 2, E. A. Seemann Verlag, Leipzig 1955.

External links 

 More works by Hermanns @ ArtNet
 Biographical sketch from Thieme-Becker in Rudolf Vierhaus (Ed.): Deutsche Biographische Enzyklopädie. Vol. 4: Görres–Hittorp. Saur Verlag, 2006, 

1862 births
1942 deaths
19th-century German painters
19th-century German male artists
German landscape painters
German lithographers
Kunstakademie Düsseldorf alumni
20th-century German painters
20th-century German male artists